Epacris grandis, commonly known as grand heath or tall heath, is a species of flowering plant in the heath family Ericaceae and is endemic to a small area of Tasmania. It is a robust, erect shrub with smooth stems, lance-shaped leaves and tube-shaped flowers with white petals.

Description
Flowering occurs from October to March, with a peak in December.

Taxonomy and naming
Epacris grandis was first formally described in 1986 by Ron Crowden in Papers and Proceedings of the Royal Society of Tasmania based on plant material he collected near Bicheno in 1984. The specific epithet (grandis) means "large" or "tall".

Distribution and habitat
This epacris is only known from in and near the Douglas-Apsley National Park in eastern Tasmania where it grows in woodland.

Conservation status
Epacris grandis is classified as "endangered" under the Australian Government Environment Protection and Biodiversity Conservation Act 1999 and the Tasmanian Government Threatened Species Protection Act 1995. The main threats to the species include dieback due to the fungus Phytophthora cinnamomi, inappropriate fire regimes, land clearing and weed invasion. A recovery plan for threatened Tasmanian forest epacrids has been prepared.

References

grandis
Ericales of Australia
Flora of Tasmania
Plants described in 1986